Luis Antonio Oro Giral (born 13 June 1945 in Zaragoza) has been professor of Chemistry at the University of Zaragoza since 1982. His main research interests are in organometallic chemistry and homogeneous catalysis with a special interest in reaction mechanisms. He has coauthored well over 500 scientific papers being co-author or co-editor of several books. He has received numerous national and international awards and honors, and is member of several international scientific academies. He has been President of the European Association for Chemical and Molecular Sciences (2008–2011) and President of the Spanish Royal Society of Chemistry (2000–2005). He has also served in high-level positions in the Spanish public administration with responsibilities for science.

References

External links 

 

Spanish chemists
Academic staff of the University of Zaragoza
1945 births
Living people